Iran women's national sitting volleyball team represents the country at international events.

Paralympics 
Iran women's national sitting volleyball team qualified for the 2016 Summer Paralympics after reaching the finals of the 2014 Asian Para Games, the first time the women's team had qualified for the Paralympics.  They won the event, after beating China who had previously qualified for the 2016 Games at the world championships earlier in the year in sets of 25–15, 25–12, and 25–15.  Maleki Zeinab Dizicheh and Abdi Zahra were the team's key players in the tournament.  In the year before the Games, the team trained in Isfahan, where there were 20 members at camp along with players from the junior national team. Warm up events for the team include the March 2015 Intercontinental Cup.

Staff 
In 2015, Farid Saebi was serving as the team's technical director.

See also
 Volleyball at the Summer Paralympics
 World Organization Volleyball for Disabled

References

National sitting volleyball teams
S
volleyball